Copper Sun is a 2006  young adult novel by Coretta Scott King Award-winning author Sharon Draper. It was a National Book Award winner.

Background 
When Draper traveled to Ghana, West Africa, she visited the Point of No Return and the castles had thousands of slaves that were kept before getting on the ship which made her inspired to write this novel. Copper Sun addresses the Transatlantic Slave Trade, slavery in America, and freedom.

Plot 
Amari, a 15-year old girl, is with Kwasi, her 8-year old brother, in her village of Ziavi, Africa. Kwasi is in a coconut tree when Amari tells him to get down and bring some fruits to their mother. Kwasi teases Amari by saying he saw her promised to Besa, a drummer from their village. Amari then starts describing her village. She meets up with Besa, who is going to the elders of the village, claiming to have seen strangers who have "skin the color of goat’s milk.” She goes back to her family's home, uneasy. After talking with her mother about these people, they conclude that they must welcome these people, and start making preparations for their guests. The men arrive later, along with warriors from the Ashanti, a nearby tribe. After exchanging gifts, the village storyteller, Komla, who is Amari's own father, starts telling tales about the past. Then ceremonial dancing begins, to the beat of ceremonial drums.

Suddenly, one of the white men shoots the village chief with his gun. Fighting follows, with various villagers trying to escape, only to be killed by the white men. The Ashanti warriors that accompanied the men join them in capturing the villagers. Both of Amari's parents are killed, and later when she tries to escape with her brother, he is killed as well before she is shackled and brought back to the village. At daybreak, she discovers that only 24 villagers are alive, and all of them are like her, young and fairly healthy. Amari and the other villagers are then shackled in the neck to each other and are commanded by the white men to start walking. Several of the villagers die, some from wounds, others from simply losing the will to live. Amari, along with the surviving villagers and a few other groups of captives then arrive at Cape Coast, in what is nowadays Southern Ghana.

There, she is thrown into a prison with other women, having lost their families in the mass genocide, who were now hostile, where she befriends a lady called Afi. Afi, with no family of her own, treats Amari like her own daughter. Afi starts telling Amari of all the horrible things that await her. After a few days, all of the women are brought out of their mass cells and inspected by a thin, white man. Amari initially resists, but after being slapped in the face by the white man and hearing advice from Afi, she suffers while he probes her. Then, the women are bought by the thin white man and sent through a long, narrow tunnel in the side of the wall. Amari goes through and is then pulled up at the end of the tunnel.

She then looks out onto the sea for the first time, admiring how beautiful the sand is, and how vast the ocean is. She then sees the large freighter that the white men came in, and she likens it to a place of death. She is then brought to a fire, where she is branded and then thrown into another cell, with other people that have also been branded. She watches as several of the Ashanti, who had helped the white men in capturing Amari's village, among other villages, are also branded and then thrown into the cell. Besa was the last one to be thrown into the cell, and Amari briefly looks at him. They are given no water during the day, but at night, they are fed well, mainly to strengthen them for the journey, Afi tells Amari. Afi then tell Amari that they will never see Africa again. Amari then manages to sleep. At daybreak, the prisoners are fed more food, and medicine is applied to the spot where they were branded. Amari watches sadly as Besa, along with the men, are taken out of the cell. Afi advises Amari to forget about him, and when she asks why didn't Afi just leave her to die, she responds that she must survive to tell future generations their story.

The women were then led out by their captors, and Amari watches as the men are loaded into a small boat, and taken to the larger freighter. Amari, along with the other women are loaded into another waiting boat and then rowed across to the freighter. Amari watches as two women try to escape and jump off the boat, only to be consumed by two sharks. The women are then led aboard the freighter. They are pushed into the cargo hold aboard the freighter, which smells terrible due to the men urinating and defecating wherever they can. Once they are in the women's area of the hold, Afi starts humming an old funeral song in which eventually all of the women join in.

After several hours, the women are led out of the cargo hold, fed, and thrown saltwater on to roughly clean them. A white man then starts drumming on a barrel and tells them to "dance", jumping up and down. Amari notices one white man with orange-colored hair looking her directly at her face, not at her body, as the other white men are doing with the other women. The women are then chained to the deck, and Afi tells Amari that that night, they will be forced to have sex with the men. Then, the men are brought on deck, and go through the same procedure that the women go through. When the men finish, they are brought back down to the hold. At nightfall, the white men start choosing women to have sex with. The orange-haired man, whose name is Bill, comes to Amari and takes her to his room. He then tells her to scream, and after she does, he allowed her to sit and gives her water, then starts teaching her English.

After a couple of hours, he leads her back outside, gives her more water, and ties her gently to a mast, after which he leaves. Amari tells Afi that she was not raped, and Afi tells her that she was lucky this night, but that the next night, or the night after that, she will be taken. Afi then consoles Amari and hugs her. The next few nights, Amari is raped, and thrown back onto the deck. Bill occasionally rescues Amari from the other men and teaches her English. When they are close to arriving to their destination, the slaves are fed better and the doctor of the ship tends to them. When they arrive at Sullivan's Island, South Carolina, they are inspected and then brought to a prison, where they are told that they will stay there for 10 days to make sure they do not have any diseases, such as smallpox. Amari has a short reunion with Besa, before he is taken to another part of the prison.

After the quarantine, Amari and the other women are taken to a slave auction. They are all stripped, probed, fondled, and strapped to tables. On a deck to one side of the clearing is an indentured young woman named Polly, who thinks of the soon to be enslaved Africans as inferior. Mr. Derby, a large, noticeably greasy man buys Amari and Polly after auctioning with other plantation owners. Polly was bought because she had a 14-year long indenture because of the debt her parents didn't pay off. Mr. Derby also has a son named Clay, who disgusts both of the young women. Amari was bought as a "present" for Clay, and he gave her the name "Myna" to reinforce his ownership. Initially, tensions are high between Polly and Amari because of her prejudice. The wagon ride to Derbyshire Farms is very uncomfortable for Amari and Polly, who are belittled by Clay and Mr. Derby the few times they speak up.

Characters 
 Amari is a strong 15-year-old slave, and the main character who endures the horrors of slavery.
Polly is a 15-year-old indentured servant that changes her mind about slavery when she meets Amari and sees how they are treated.
Mrs. Derby is a sweet, affectionate woman and Mr. Derby's 18 year old, second wife. She gets pregnant by Noah, a slave and her bodyguard whom she loves,  and Mr. Derby gets so enraged by his wife having a black baby, that he kills Noah and the baby.
 Nathan is a kind young man who helps the children along their journey.
 Noah is a caring, strong young man who is in love with Mrs. Derby, and impregnates Mrs. Derby. He is her bodyguard.
Besa "Buck" is a drummer from Amari's village and her fiancé who becomes enslaved after the capture.
Clay is Mr. Derby's son who impregnates Amari. He is left tied to a tree by the children as a rattlesnake is slithering toward him.
Mr. Derby is the harsh and cruel slave owner who kills Mrs. Derby's baby and Noah.
Kwasi is Amari's precocious little brother.
 Komla Amari and Kwasi's father is the village storyteller who was murdered during the capture.
Tidbit is an overly imaginative child. He is also the son of Teenie. He loves Hushpuppy, his dog, very much, and hates the thought of parting with him.
Afi is Amari's good friend who is like a motherly figure to Amari from the boat to the new land.
Teenie is Tidbits mother. She was born into slavery. She is the head chef at Derbyshire farms. She helps Amari settle in and gives Amari and Polly jobs to help around the kitchen

Reception 
Most critics saw Copper Sun as “unflinching and unforgettable.” Another critic thought of the novel as “character driven, with a fast moving plot, and unforgettable characters.” Agreeing, another critic noted that the novel was "horrific" "multi-faceted" and that "[they were] afraid to turn the page." Beverly Almond noted that the novel expresses “unimaginable hardship” and “starvation and disease.” Another critic claimed that the book showed themes of "pain, hope, and determination" and "human exploitation and suffering." Kirkus Reviews added that the novel showed "cynicism and realistic outlook."

Awards and nominations
Sharon Draper's Copper Sun won the Coretta Scott King award in 2007.

Bibliography

References 

American young adult novels
African-American young adult novels
2006 American novels
American historical novels
Novels about American slavery
Novels about slavery
Novels by Sharon Draper
Coretta Scott King Award-winning works